Syed Saeed ul Hassan is a Pakistani politician who was the Provincial Minister of Punjab for Auqaf and Religious Affairs, in office from 13 September 2018 till April 2022. He had been a Member of the Provincial Assembly of the Punjab from August 2018 till January 2023.

Early life and education
He was born on 13 October 1961 in Zafarwal.

He received the degree of Master of Arts in Arabic in 1983 from the University of the Punjab. He also holds a Bachelor of Arts degree.

Political career
He was elected to the Provincial Assembly of the Punjab as an independent candidate from Constituency PP-132 (Narowal-I) in 2002 Pakistani general election. He received 29,759 votes and defeated Awais Qasim Khan. On 24 November 2003, he was inducted into the provincial Punjab cabinet of Chief Minister Chaudhry Pervaiz Elahi and was appointed as Provincial Minister of Punjab for Religious Affairs and Auqaf.

He was re-elected to the Provincial Assembly of the Punjab as an independent candidate from Constituency PP-46 (Narowal-I) in 2018 Pakistani general election.

He joined Pakistan Tehreek-e-Insaf (PTI) following his election.

On 12 September 2018, he was inducted into the provincial Punjab cabinet of Chief Minister Sardar Usman Buzdar. On 13 September 2018, he was appointed as Provincial Minister of Punjab for Auqaf and Religious Affairs.

References

Living people
Punjab MPAs 2018–2023
Pakistan Tehreek-e-Insaf MPAs (Punjab)
1961 births
Provincial ministers of Punjab